The 1956 United States presidential election in Connecticut took place on November 6, 1956, as part of the 1956 United States presidential election which was held throughout all contemporary 48 states. Voters chose eight representatives, or electors to the Electoral College, who voted for president and vice president. 

Connecticut voted for the Republican nominee, incumbent President Dwight D. Eisenhower of Pennsylvania, over the Democratic nominee, former Governor Adlai Stevenson of Illinois. Eisenhower ran with incumbent Vice President Richard Nixon of California, while Stevenson's running mate was Senator Estes Kefauver of Tennessee.

Eisenhower won Connecticut by a margin of 27.46%, which made Connecticut 12% more Republican than the nation-at-large and Eisenhower's eighth-best state in the nation. As of 2020, this was the most recent presidential election in which the Republican nominee carried the town of Bloomfield and the cities of Middletown, New Britain, and New Haven. This is also the most recent election where Connecticut voted more Republican than Arizona, Colorado, Idaho, Indiana, Montana, North Dakota, and Wyoming.

Results

By county

See also
 United States presidential elections in Connecticut

References

Connecticut
1956
1956 Connecticut elections